The 2018–19 Liga IV was the 77th season of the Liga IV, the fourth tier of the Romanian football league system. The champions of each county association play against one from a neighboring county in a playoff to gain promotion. This is the second season when the counties were divided into 7 regions, each consisting of 6 counties and the draw was made on 15 February 2019, with 4 months before the first matches.

Promotion play-off 
The matches are scheduled to be played on 15 and 22 June 2019.

|-
|colspan="3" style="background-color:#97DEFF"|Region 1 (North-East)
|colspan="2" style="background-color:#97DEFF"|
||5–0||1–1
||1–4||2–1
||w/o||w/o
|-
|colspan="3" style="background-color:#97DEFF"|Region 2 (North-West)
|colspan="2" style="background-color:#97DEFF"|
||2–2||0–2
||5–0||1–1
||0–2||0–2
|-
|colspan="3" style="background-color:#97DEFF"|Region 3 (Center)
|colspan="2" style="background-color:#97DEFF"|
||2–3||1–2
||2–1||2–3
||6–0||3–2
|-
|colspan="3" style="background-color:#97DEFF"|Region 4 (West)
|colspan="2" style="background-color:#97DEFF"|
||0–2||1–6
||2–1||1–0
||2–1||0–3
|-
|colspan="3" style="background-color:#97DEFF"|Region 5 (South-West)
|colspan="2" style="background-color:#97DEFF"|
||1–2||0–3
||0–0||0–1
||2–0||2–1
|-
|colspan="3" style="background-color:#97DEFF"|Region 6 (South)
|colspan="2" style="background-color:#97DEFF"|
||3–3||2–1
||2–0||0–0
||0–3||1–6
|-
|colspan="3" style="background-color:#97DEFF"|Region 7 (South-East)
|colspan="2" style="background-color:#97DEFF"|
||2–1||3–0
||5–1||3–0 (forfeit)
||1–2||1–6
|}

County leagues

Alba County

Arad County

Argeș County

Bacău County

Bacău Series

Valea Trotușului Series

Championship play-off  
The teams was start the play-off with points gained in the regular season, after the results with the last two teams was canceled.

Bihor County

Relegation play-out  
The 13th-placed team of the Liga IV – Bihor County faces the 2nd-placed team of the Liga V – Bihor County Seria I and 14th-placed team of the Liga IV – Bihor County faces the 2nd-placed team of the Liga V – Bihor County Seria II.

|}

Bistrița-Năsăud County 
South Series

North Series

Championship play-off 

Championship play-out

Botoșani County

Brașov County

Brăila County

Championship play-off  
The championship play-off played in a double round-robin tournament between the best five ranked teams from regular season. The teams started with half of the points accumulated in the first stage of the season.

Championship play-out  
The championship play-out played in a double round-robin tournament between the last four ranked teams from regular season. The teams started with half of the points accumulated in the first stage of the season.

Bucharest

Championship play-off  
Championship play-off played in a single round-robin tournament between the best four teams of the regular season. The teams started the play-off with the following points: 1st place – 3 points, 2nd place – 2 points, 3rd place – 1 point, 4th place – 0 points.

Buzău County

Caraș-Severin County

Călărași County

Cluj County

Constanța County

Covasna County

Dâmbovița County

Dolj County

Championship play-off  
The championship play-off played between the first six teams of the Regular season. The teams will start the play-off with the number of points gained in the regular season only against the other qualified teams.

Galați County

Giurgiu County

South Series

North Series

Championship play-off  
The championship play-off played between the best two ranked teams in each series of the regular season. All matches were played at Ion Mangeac Stadium in Izvoarele on 4 and 5 June  the semi-finals and on 8 June 2019 the final.

Semi-finals

Final 

Mihai Bravu won the 2018–19 Liga IV Giurgiu  and qualify for promotion play-off to Liga III.

Gorj County

Harghita County

West Series

East Series

East Series play-off  
The teams started the play-off with half of the points accumulated in the regular season.

East Series play-out  
The teams started the play-out with half of the points accumulated in the regular season.

Championship final  

|}
Gheorgheni won the 2018–19 Liga IV Harghita  and qualify for promotion play-off to Liga III.

Hunedoara County

Ialomița County

Iași County

Ilfov County

Maramureș County

South Series

North Series

Championship final  
The championship final was played on 25 May and 1 June  2019 between the winners of the two series.

||1–3||1–5
|}
Viitorul Ulmeni won the 2018–19 Liga IV Maramureș  and qualify for promotion play-off.

Mehedinți County

Mureș County

Neamț County

Championship play-off  
The championship play-off was played in a double round-robin tournament between the best four teams of the Regular season. The teams started with half of the points accumulated in the first stage of the season.

Olt County

Prahova County

Satu Mare County 
Seria A (Tur-Talna Zone)

Seria B (Someș Zone)

Seria C (Crasna Zone)

Play-off 
In the play-offs played the teams from the 2nd place of the three series. All matches was played at Daniel Prodan Stadium in Satu Mare on 27, 28 and 29 May 2019. 

Final four 
Semi-final

||3–1||1–2
||8–0||1–0
|}
Final

||0–3||2–1
|}
Satu Mare won the 2018–19 Liga IV Satu Mare and qualify for promotion play-off to Liga III.

Sălaj County

Sibiu County

Suceava County

Teleorman County

Timiș County

Tulcea County

Championship play-off  
The championship play-off played in a double round-robin tournament between the best four ranked teams from regular season. The teams started with half of the points accumulated in the first stage of the season.

Vaslui County

Relegation play-out  

|}
Moara Domnească and Juventus Fălciu were relegated to Liga V – Vaslui.

|}
Sporting Bârlad relegated to Liga V – Vaslui.

Championship play-off

Quarter-finals 

|}

Semi-finals 

|}

Final 

|}
Hușana Huși won the 2018–19 Liga IV Vaslui and qualify for promotion play-off to Liga III.

Vâlcea County

Championship play-off

Relegation play-out

Promotion/relegation play-off  
The 9th and 10th-placed teams of the 2018–19 Liga IV Vâlcea faces the 3rd-placed teams in the two series of the 2018–19 Liga V Vâlcea.

|}

Vrancea County

Group A

Group B

Group C

Possible qualification to championship play-off  
At the end of the regular season, a special table was made between 3rd places from the three series. The best two teams in this table was qualify in the championship play-off . In this table, 3rd place teams are included with the points obtained against the first two ranked in their series.

Championship play-off  
The championship play-off played between best eight teams from the regular season in a double round-robin tournament.

See also 
 2018–19 Liga I
 2018–19 Liga II
 2018–19 Liga III

References

External links 
 FRF

Liga IV seasons
4
Romania